The Mongolian People's Central Theatre is a theatre based in Ulan Bator, Mongolia. It was established on November 12, 1931.

References

Theatres in Mongolia
Buildings and structures in Ulaanbaatar
1931 establishments in Mongolia